Beodizo was a settlement and station (mutatio) of ancient Thrace, inhabited during Byzantine times. 

References

Populated places in ancient Thrace
Former populated places in Turkey
Populated places of the Byzantine Empire
History of Tekirdağ Province